Kim Bærentzen (8 November 1905 – 18 June 1999) was a Danish fencer. He competed at the 1928 and 1936 Summer Olympics.

References

1905 births
1999 deaths
Danish male fencers
Olympic fencers of Denmark
Fencers at the 1928 Summer Olympics
Fencers at the 1936 Summer Olympics
Sportspeople from Copenhagen